The name Aring has been used in the Philippines by PAGASA in the Western Pacific.
 Super Typhoon Sally (1964) (T6418, 27W, Aring), struck the Philippines and China
 Tropical Storm Nora (1976) (T7625, 25W, Aring)
 Typhoon Betty (1980) (Aring), made landfall on Luzon, caused 81 fatalities
 Typhoon Doyle (1984) (T8427, 30W, Aring), did not make landfall

Pacific typhoon set index articles